The 2003–2004 Baltimore mayoral election saw the reelection of incumbent mayor Martin O'Malley.

In 1999, Baltimore citizens voted to move mayoral elections to take place in presidential election years, effective with the 2004 elections. However, primary dates in Maryland can only be set by the General Assembly, which refused to move the primary to 2004. As a result, while the primary took place on September 9, 2003; the general election took place 14 months later, on November 2, 2004. Democratic incumbent Martin O'Malley was reelected, but only to a three-year term rather than the usual four-year term.

It would be 2012 before the General Assembly finally agreed to move municipal elections to coincide with presidential elections, effective in 2016.

Nominations

Democratic primary

Republican primary

General election

References

2003 Maryland elections
2004 Maryland elections
Mayoral elections in Baltimore
Baltimore
Baltimore
Martin O'Malley